(not only) Black+White was a photography, arts and popular culture magazine, published in Australia between 1992 and 2007.

History and profile
Issue No. 00 was launched on 12 November 1992 and the final issue No. 88 was published in January 2007. (not only) Black+White was commissioned by Marcello Grand, publisher of Studio Magazines Pty Ltd. Located in Sydney, (not only) Black+White was designed by British graphic designers Katherine Carnegie and Matthew Hawker between 1992 and 1994, with later design and typography by Art Director+Designer Andrew Godfrey, Designers Cassidy Hall, Christopher Holt and Art Director/Designer Tim McIntyre. Andrew Godfrey's work for the magazine received 15 international awards for magazine design and typography. (not only) Black+White was edited initially by Horacio Silva and then in later years by Karen-Jane Eyre and Nick Dent. The magazine was published six times a year by Studio Magazines Pty Ltd. (not only) Black+White was a pictorially-led publication that became an internationally acclaimed visual arts magazine showcasing the world's best image makers. It included interviews with photographers and celebrities and features on popular culture and current events. The magazine gained notoriety for publishing nude photographs of mainly Australian celebrities, athletes, pop and soap stars.

Spinoff Magazines

B+W Mode

(not only) Blue

(not only) Sport

References

External links
Matthew Hawker website
Andrew Godfrey - later designer of (not only) Black+White, winning fifteen awards for his typography and magazine design work for it.

1992 establishments in Australia
2007 disestablishments in Australia
Visual arts magazines
Quarterly magazines published in Australia
Celebrity magazines
Defunct magazines published in Australia
Magazines established in 1992
Magazines disestablished in 2007
Magazines published in Sydney
Photography magazines
Photography in Australia
Arts magazines published in Australia